The 2007 European Canoe Slalom Championships took place at the Ondrej Cibak Whitewater Slalom Course in Liptovský Mikuláš, Slovakia between June 11 and 17, 2007 under the auspices of the European Canoe Association (ECA). It was the 8th edition.

Medal summary

Men's results

Canoe

Kayak

Women's results

Kayak

Medal table

References
 Official results
 European Canoe Association

European Canoe Slalom Championships
European Canoe Slalom Championships
European Canoe Slalom Championships
Liptovský Mikuláš District
International sports competitions hosted by Slovakia
Canoeing and kayaking competitions in Slovakia